The 2012–13 Argentine Primera C is the season of professional fourth division of Argentine football league system. With a total of 20 teams competing there, the champion is promoted to the upper level, Primera B Metropolitana.

Club information

Table

Standings

Torneo Reducido
The semifinals and finals is determined by the team standings in the regular season.

Semifinals

|-

|-

|-
|}

Finals

|-

|-
|}

Relegation

Playoff for relegation/promotion playoff 

|}

See also
2012–13 in Argentine football

References

External links
List of Argentine second division champions by RSSSF
Futbol de Ascenso Primera C 

4
Primera C seasons